Ludwig Wilhelm Gilbert (12 August 1769 – 7 March 1824) was a German physicist and chemist, and professor of physics at the University of Leipzig. From 1799-1824 he published the "Annalen der Physik", of which Poggendorffs "Annalen der Physik und Chemie" was a continuation.

Biography
Gilbert was born in Berlin. After studying mathematics and geography in the University of Halle, he was appointed as professor in 1795. In 1811, he was appointed as professor of physics at the University of Leipzig, and remained in that post until his death. He died in Leipzig.

Since 1816 he had been a correspondent of the Royal Institute of the Netherlands.

References

Sources
 Ludwig Wilhelm Gilbert

1769 births
1824 deaths
19th-century German physicists
18th-century German chemists
University of Halle alumni
Academic staff of the University of Halle
Academic staff of Leipzig University
Scientists from Berlin
Members of the Royal Netherlands Academy of Arts and Sciences
18th-century German physicists